Čučići is an uninhabited settlement in Croatia. It is in Zagreb County.

Ghost towns in Croatia